FatWire Software was a privately held company selling web content management system (CMS) software. It was acquired by Oracle Corporation in 2011, and its products rolled up into Oracle's WebCenter product lines.

History 
 1996:  Established by Mark Fasciano, Ari Kahn and John Murcott,
 2003:  Acquired Open Market's Enterprise web content management assets including Content Server from divine, founded as FutureTense.
 2004:  Launched Content Server 6.0 WCM software
 2007:  Yogesh Gupta was named president and CEO in August, acquired Infostoria in October, launched their strategy for Web Experience Management in November.
 2010: FatWire and EMC Corporation announced a partnership in which EMC will resell FatWire's products as their strategic Web Experience Management solution. In return FatWire acquired the rights to resell EMC's digital asset management software
 2011: On June 21, 2011, Oracle announced it was acquiring FatWire Software. In July of 2011, Oracle purchased Fatwire for $163 million with the assistance of Bingham McCutchen
 2012: In February 2012 Oracle releases Oracle WebCenter 11gR1 (11.1.1.6.0) incorporating WebCenter Sites – the new name for Fatwire Content Server.

Market
FatWire's revenue for 2009 has been estimated to be around $40M by Real Story Group.

Further reading
 Barb Mosher (Feb. 16, 2010) EMC Replaces their WCM with FatWire's Web Experience Management
Sharon Fisher (Jan. 13, 2010)  FatWire introduces WEM framework
 Richard V. Dragan (July 1, 2001) Elegant Content Management, PC Magazine (UpdateEngine5 review)
 Mark Gibbs (January 5, 2004) FatWire serves content big time Network World (covers their product line as of 2004)

References

External links
 Official  FatWire website

Defunct software companies of the United States
Software companies based in New York (state)
Defunct companies based in New York (state)
Software companies established in 1996
Technology companies disestablished in 2011
1996 establishments in New York City
2011 disestablishments in New York (state)
Oracle acquisitions